Hermione Jean Granger  is a fictional character in J. K. Rowling's Harry Potter series. She first appears in the novel Harry Potter and the Philosopher's Stone (1997), on the Hogwarts express as a first year student on her way to Hogwarts. After Harry and Ron save her from a mountain troll in the girls' restroom, she becomes best friends with them and often uses her quick wit, deft recall, and encyclopaedic knowledge to lend aid in dire situations. Rowling has stated that Hermione resembles herself as a young girl, with her insecurity and fear of failure.

The character has had immense popularity. The version of Hermione portrayed by Emma Watson in all eight Harry Potter films from Philosopher's Stone in 2001 to Deathly Hallows – Part 2 in 2011 was voted the best female character of all time in a poll conducted amongst Hollywood professionals by The Hollywood Reporter in 2016.

Character development 
Hermione is a Muggle-born Gryffindor, who becomes best friends with Harry Potter and Ron Weasley. Rowling states that she was born on 19 September 1979 and she was nearly twelve when she first attended Hogwarts. She is an overachiever who excels academically and is described by Rowling as a "very logical, upright and good" character. Rowling adds that Hermione's parents, two Muggle dentists, are a bit bemused by their odd daughter but "quite proud of her all the same". They are well aware of the wizard world and have visited Diagon Alley with her. Hermione is an only child. But Rowling revealed in a 2004 interview that Hermione was originally intended to have a sister, but the planned sibling did not appear since she felt it "might be too late now" to introduce the character. Rowling has called the character of Luna Lovegood the "anti-Hermione" as they are so very different.

Rowling said the character of Hermione has several autobiographic influences: "I did not set out to make Hermione like me but she is a bit like me. She is an exaggeration of how I was when I was younger." She recalled being called a "little know-it-all" in her youth. And she says that not unlike herself, "there is a lot of insecurity and a great fear of failure" beneath Hermione's swottiness. Finally, according to Rowling, next to Albus Dumbledore, Hermione is the perfect expository character; because of her encyclopedic knowledge, she can always be used as a plot dump to explain the Harry Potter universe. Rowling also states that her feminist conscience is rescued by Hermione, "who's the brightest witch of her age" and a "very strong female character."

Hermione's first name is taken from a character in William Shakespeare's The Winter's Tale, though Rowling has said that the two characters have little to nothing in common. Rowling said that she wanted her name to be unusual since if fewer girls had the name, fewer girls would get teased for it and it seemed the sort of name that "a pair of professional dentists, who liked to prove how clever they were" would give their daughter. Her original surname was "Puckle", but Rowling felt the name "did not suit her at all", and so the less frivolous Granger was used.

Harry Potter books

Harry Potter and the Philosopher's Stone
Hermione first appears in Harry Potter and the Philosopher's Stone when she meets Harry and Ron on the Hogwarts Express, where she mocks Ron for his inability to perform a spell to turn his rat yellow. She proves just how much she knows by declaring that she memorized all the textbooks by heart.  She constantly annoys her peers with her knowledge, so Harry and Ron initially consider her arrogant, especially after she criticises Ron's incantation of the Levitation Charm. They heartily dislike her until they rescue her from a troll, for which she is so thankful that she lies to protect them from punishment, thus winning their friendship. Hermione's knack for logic later enables the trio to solve a puzzle that is essential to retrieving the Philosopher's Stone, and she defeats the constrictive Devil's Snare plant by summoning a jet of "bluebell flame".

Hermione is the brains behind the plan to enter the place where the Stone is hidden. She responds to Harry's wariness of Professor Severus Snape and is also suspicious of him. She reveals to Harry and Ron that she does a lot of research in the library, which helped her defeat the Devil's Snare and work out the logic of the potions.

Rowling said on her website that she resisted her editor's requests to remove the troll scene, stating "Hermione is so very arrogant and annoying in the early part of Philosopher's Stone that I really felt it needed something (literally) huge to bring her together with Harry and Ron."

Harry Potter and the Chamber of Secrets
Hermione (along with Ron's mother Molly Weasley and a few female students of Hogwarts) develops a liking for Defence Against the Dark Arts (DADA) teacher Gilderoy Lockhart as he had written all the books required for the DADA in Chamber of Secrets. During a morning confrontation between the Gryffindor and Slytherin Quidditch teams, a brawl nearly ensues after Draco Malfoy calls her a "Mudblood", an insulting epithet for Muggle-born wizards when she defends the Gryffindor Quidditch team. She concocts the Polyjuice Potion needed for the trio to disguise themselves as Draco's housemates to collect information about the Heir of Slytherin who has reopened the Chamber of Secrets. However, she is unable to join Harry and Ron in the investigation after the hair plucked from the robes of Slytherin student Millicent Bulstrode (with whom Hermione was previously matched up during Lockhart's ill-fated Duelling Club) was that of her cat, whose appearance she takes on in her human form; it takes several weeks for the effects to completely wear off. Hermione is Petrified by the basilisk after successfully identifying the creature through library research. Though she lies incapacitated in the hospital wing, the information she has found and left behind is crucial to Harry and Ron in their successful mission to solve the mystery of the Chamber of Secrets. Hermione is revived after Harry kills the basilisk, but she is distraught to learn that all end-of-year exams have been cancelled as a school treat.

Harry Potter and the Prisoner of Azkaban
Hermione buys a cat named Crookshanks, who takes to chasing Ron's pet rat, Scabbers. Before the start of term, Professor Minerva McGonagall secretly gives Hermione a Time-Turner, a device which lets her go back in time and handle her heavy class schedule, though this is not revealed until the penultimate chapter. Much tension comes into play between Hermione and her two best friends; Harry is furious with her because she told McGonagall that he got a Firebolt, which was confiscated to be inspected for traces of dark magic. Ron is angry because he feels Crookshanks caused Scabbers' disappearance, while Hermione fiercely maintains that Crookshanks is innocent.

While filling in for Remus Lupin in one DADA class, Snape labels Hermione "an insufferable know-it-all" and penalises Gryffindor after she speaks out of turn in her attempt to describe a werewolf when no one else does. She correctly deduces Lupin's secret after completing Snape's homework assignment from the class. Crookshanks proves vital in exposing Scabbers as Peter Pettigrew, an erstwhile friend of James and Lily Potter, who revealed their whereabouts to Voldemort the night of their murders, and was able to wrongly implicate Sirius Black (revealed to be Harry's godfather) in the Potters' deaths. The Time-Turner enables Hermione and Harry to rescue Sirius and the hippogriff Buckbeak.

Harry Potter and the Goblet of Fire
Hermione is horrified by the cruelty that house-elves suffer, and establishes S.P.E.W., the Society for the Promotion of Elfish Welfare, as an effort to gain basic rights for them. She is Bulgarian Quidditch prodigy Viktor Krum's date at the Yule Ball of the Triwizard Tournament. The proper pronunciation of her name (Her-my-oh-nee) is interjected into the plot when she teaches it to Krum; the best he can do is "Herm-own-ninny," but she has no problem with it. She later gets into a heated argument with Ron after he accuses her of "fraternising with the enemy" about her friendship with Krum. In the book, Hermione's feelings toward Ron are hinted at when she says that Ron can't see her "like a girl," but Krum could. She supports Harry through the Triwizard Tournament, helping him prepare for each task. At the end of the second task, Krum asks her to come to see him over the summer in Bulgaria, but she politely declines. Near the end of term, she stops fraudulent tabloid reporter and unregistered Animagus, Rita Skeeter, who had published defamatory material about Hermione, Harry, and Hagrid during the Triwizard Tournament, by holding her Animagus form (a beetle) captive in a jar.

Harry Potter and the Order of the Phoenix
Hermione becomes a Gryffindor prefect along with Ron and befriends Luna Lovegood, but their friendship has a rocky start after Hermione chastises the publication of Luna's father: "The Quibbler's rubbish, everyone knows that." She also lambasts housemate Lavender Brown for believing the Daily Prophet's allegations of Harry fabricating stories of Voldemort's return. Ron and Hermione spend much of their time bickering, likely due to their growing romantic feelings toward one another, but they show continued loyalty to Harry. One turning point in the series is when Hermione conceives the idea of Harry secretly teaching defensive magic to a small band of students in defiance of the Ministry of Magic's dictum to teach only the subject's basic principles from a textbook, with no hands-on practice. Hermione gets an unexpectedly huge response, and the group becomes the nascent Dumbledore's Army. She is involved in the battle in the Department of Mysteries and seriously injured by a spell from Death Eater Antonin Dolohov, but makes a full recovery.

Harry Potter and the Half-Blood Prince
New Potions professor Horace Slughorn invites Hermione to join his "Slug Club", and she helps Ron retain his spot on the Gryffindor Quidditch team when she casts a  spell on Cormac McLaggen, causing him to miss his last save attempt during Keeper tryouts. Hermione's feelings for Ron continue to grow and she decides to make a move by inviting him to Slughorn's Christmas Party, but he romances Lavender instead in retaliation for his belief that Hermione had kissed Krum years earlier. She attempts to get even by dating Cormac at the Christmas party, but her plan goes awry and she abandons him midway through the party. Ron and Hermione continually feud with each other (Ron is upset with her because she set birds to attack him after seeing him and Lavender kissing; Hermione is mostly mad because of her growing jealousy) until he suffers a near-fatal poisoning from tainted mead, which frightens her enough to reconcile with him. After Dumbledore's death, Ron and Hermione both vow to stay by Harry's side regardless what happens. A minor subplot in the book is that Hermione and Harry form a rivalry in Potions, as Hermione is used to coming first in her subjects and is angry that Harry outperforms her undeservedly by following tips and different instructions written in the margins of Harry's potions book by the previous owner. Hermione is also the only one of the trio to successfully pass her Apparition test (Ron failed, albeit barely, and Harry was too young).

Harry Potter and the Deathly Hallows

In the seventh and last book, Hermione accompanies Harry on his quest to destroy Voldemort's remaining Horcruxes. Before leaving on the quest, she helps ensure the safety of her parents by placing a false memory charm on them, making them think they are Wendell and Monica Wilkins, whose lifetime ambition is to move to Australia. She inherits Dumbledore's copy of The Tales of Beedle the Bard, which allows her to decipher some secrets of the Deathly Hallows. She prepared for their departure and journey by placing an Undetectable Extension Charm on a small beaded purse so she can fill the infinite depths of the bag with things they will need. Hermione's spell saves her and Harry from Lord Voldemort and his snake Nagini in Godric's Hollow, though the ricochet snaps Harry's wand. When she, Ron, and Harry are caught by Snatchers, who are hunting for Muggle-borns under the Ministry's orders, Hermione disguises Harry by temporarily disfiguring his face with a Stinging Jinx. She also tries to pass herself off as former Hogwarts student Penelope Clearwater and a half-blood to avoid persecution, but they are recognised and taken to Malfoy Manor. Bellatrix Lestrange tortures her with a Cruciatus Curse in an attempt to extract information on how Hermione, Harry, and Ron came to possess Godric Gryffindor's sword (which was supposed to be safe in the Lestrange vault at Gringotts). Bellatrix orders for Griphook the goblin to inspect the sword and tell whether it is fake or real. To save Hermione, Harry convinces him to lie to Bellatrix that the sword is a fake. When the others escape their cell, Bellatrix threatens to slit Hermione's throat. Hermione, Harry, Ron and the other prisoners being held in Malfoy Manor are eventually rescued by Dobby.

Hermione later uses Polyjuice Potion to impersonate Bellatrix when the trio steal Hufflepuff's cup (a Horcrux) from Gringotts. She, Harry, and Ron join Dumbledore's Army in the Battle of Hogwarts, during which Hermione destroys Hufflepuff's cup in the Chamber of Secrets with a basilisk fang. Hermione and Ron also share their first kiss during the battle. In the final battle in the Great Hall, Hermione fights Bellatrix with the help of Ginny Weasley and Luna. However, the three of them are unable to defeat Bellatrix and stop fighting her once Molly Weasley orders them to disengage.

Epilogue and later life
Nineteen years after Voldemort's death, Hermione and Ron have two children, Rose and Hugo Granger-Weasley. Though the epilogue does not explicitly say Hermione and Ron are married, news articles and other sources treat it as fact.

In other material
In Harry Potter and the Cursed Child, it is shown that Hermione has become Minister for Magic, succeeding Kingsley Shacklebolt.

Characterisation

Appearance
The books describe Hermione as having "bushy brown hair" and brown eyes. Her front buck teeth, already very large, grow uncontrollably in Goblet of Fire after she is affected by a spell cast by Draco Malfoy. Madam Pomfrey attends to her in the hospital wing and, at her request, shrinks the teeth down to a normal size that matches her mouth. In the films, her hair is less bushy and she always has regular teeth except for a scene at the end of Philosopher's Stone where Emma Watson wore fake teeth. She stopped wearing them for the rest of the films because they caused difficulties in speech.

There is controversy over whether Hermione's skin colour is ever categorically established in the books. Some take as proof a line from Prisoner of Azkaban: "Hermione's white face was sticking out from behind a tree." They interpret this as a direct description of her skin tone. Others interpret it as a description relative to her usual complexion, arising due to fright and anxiety as she watches Harry Potter's attempt to save the hippogriff Buckbeak from execution. J.K. Rowling herself says Hermione "turned white" in that she "lost colour from her face after a shock."

Another description from early in Prisoner of Azkaban is: "They were there, both of them, sitting outside Florean Fortescue's Ice-Cream Parlour, Ron looking incredibly freckly, Hermione very brown, both waving frantically at him." Some claim this is a direct description of her skin colour, while others claim it's a relative description of the results of a tan acquired over the summer break.

Personality
Hermione's most prominent features include her prodigious intellect and cleverness. She is levelheaded, book-smart, and always very logical. Throughout the series, Hermione uses the skills of a librarian and teacher to gather the information needed to defeat Voldemort, the "Dark Lord". When in doubt, she always turns to the school library. She is often bossy yet unfailingly dutiful and loyal to her friends—a person who can always be counted on. J.K. Rowling said that Hermione "never strays off the path; she always keeps her attention focused on the job that must be done." Despite Hermione's intelligence and bossy attitude, Rowling says Hermione has "quite a lot of vulnerability in her personality," as well as a "sense of insecurity underneath," feels, "utterly inadequate... and to compensate, she tries and strives to be the best at everything at school, projecting a confidence that irritates people." During her DADA exam at the end of Prisoner of Azkaban, Hermione reveals that her biggest fear is failure after a Boggart takes the form of Professor McGonagall and tells her that she has failed all her exams.

Hermione is extremely compassionate; and very quick to help others, especially the defenceless, such as Neville Longbottom, first-years, House-Elves, fellow Muggle-borns, half-giants like Hagrid, and werewolves like Lupin. After publication of the last book, J.K. Rowling revealed that Hermione's career in the Ministry was to fight for the rights of the oppressed and disenfranchised (such as House-elves or Muggle-borns). Hermione is also very protective of her friends and values them so much that Rowling has suggested that, if Hermione looked in the Mirror of Erised, she would see Harry, Ron, and herself alive and Voldemort defeated. Hermione also learns to ignore what bullies such as Draco Malfoy say to her, often preventing Harry and Ron from retaliating and thinking of some way to outsmart him. She accepts her status as a Muggle-born, and says in Deathly Hallows that she is "a Mudblood and proud of it".

Magical abilities and skills 
Hermione is portrayed during the whole series as an exceptionally talented young witch. J.K. Rowling has said that Hermione is a "borderline genius." She got ten O.W.L.s, which were nine Outstanding and one Exceeds Expectations. She is the best student in Harry's year and is repeatedly the first student to master any spell or charm introduced in her classes and even from more advanced years, as evidenced when she can conjure a Protean Charm on the D.A.'s fake Galleon coins, which is a N.E.W.T. level charm. She is also the first one of her age to be able to cast non-verbal spells. Hermione is a competent duellist – Rowling has stated that during the first three books Hermione could have beaten Harry in any magical duel, but by the fourth book Harry had become so good at DADA that he would have defeated Hermione. Hermione did not tend to do as well in subjects that were not learned through books or formal training, as broom flying did not come as naturally to her in her first year as it did to Harry, and she showed no affinity for Divination, which she dropped from her third-year studies. She was also not good at Wizard's Chess, as it was the only thing at which she ever lost to Ron.

Hermione's Patronus is an otter, Rowling's favourite animal. In the Deathly Hallows book, while they enter the Ministry of Magic under disguise, Hermione impersonates Mafalda Hopkirk. Her wand is made of vine wood and dragon heartstring core; vine is the wood ascribed to Hermione's fictional birth month (September) on the Celtic calendar.

Reception
Hermione is viewed by many as a feminist icon. In The Ivory Tower and Harry Potter, the first book-length analysis of the Harry Potter series (edited and compiled by Lana A. Whited), a chapter titled "Hermione Granger and the Heritage of Gender" by Eliza T. Dresang, discusses Hermione's role in the series and its relation to feminist debates. The chapter begins with an analysis of Hermione's name and the role of previous characters with the same name in mythology and fiction, and the heritage Hermione has inherited from these characters due to her name. Dresang also emphasises Hermione's parallelism with Rowling herself and how, as Hermione has some attributes from Rowling herself, she must be a strong character.

The chapter also points out that, despite being born to Muggle parents, Hermione's magical abilities are innate. Her "compulsion for study" helps both the character's development, which makes Hermione "a prime example that information brings power", and the plot of the series, as her knowledge of the wizard world is often used to "save the day". Dresang states that "Harry and Ron are more dependent on Hermione than she is on them." However, she adds that Hermione's "hysteria and crying happen far too often to be considered a believable part of the development of Hermione's character and are quite out of line with her core role in the book."

UGO Networks listed Hermione as one of their best heroes of all time, saying, "Most of us can probably recall having a classmate like Hermione when we were in grammar school"—one who "can at first be a little off-putting, but once you get to know her, she's not a bad chick to have on your side". IGN also listed Hermione as their second top Harry Potter character, praising her character development. In 2016 The Hollywood Reporter did a poll of Hollywood professionals, including actors, writers and directors, into their favourite female characters of all time; Hermione topped the poll.

Philip Nel of Kansas State University notes that "Rowling, who worked for Amnesty International, evokes her social activism through Hermione's passion for oppressed elves and the formation of her 'Society for the Promotion of Elfish Welfare'". Scholars such as Brycchan Carey have praised the books' abolitionist sentiments, viewing Hermione's Society for the Promotion of Elfish Welfare as a model for younger readers' political engagement.

However, in an analysis for Harry Potter and the Deathly Hallows, Rowland Manthrope states that "seven books on, we still only know her as swottish, sensible Hermione—a caricature, not a character."

Portrayals

Film series
Emma Watson played Hermione in all eight Harry Potter films. Watson's Oxford theatre teacher passed her name on to the casting agents of Philosopher's Stone, impressed with her school play performances. Though Watson took her audition seriously, she "never really thought she had any chance" of getting the part. The producers were impressed by Watson's self-confidence and she outperformed the thousands of other girls who applied.

Rowling herself was supportive of Watson after her first screen test. When asked if she thought actors suited the characters, Rowling said, "Yes, I did. Emma Watson in particular was very, very like Hermione when I first spoke to her, I knew she was perfect from that first phone call."

Watson was well-received for the first film; IGN even commented that "from Hermione Granger's perfect introduction to her final scene, Watson is better than I could have possibly imagined. She steals the show." IGN also wrote that her "astute portrayal of Hermione has already become a favourite among fans."

Before the production of Half-Blood Prince, Watson considered not returning, but eventually decided that "the pluses outweighed the minuses" and that she could not bear to see anyone else play Hermione.

Watson has said that Hermione is a character who makes "brain not beauty cool," and that though Hermione is "slightly socially inept," she is "not ashamed of herself." When filming Chamber of Secrets, Watson was "adamant" that she wasn't like Hermione, but she reflects that "as I got older, I realised she was the greatest role model a girl could have." In 2007, before the release of Order of the Phoenix, Watson said, "There are too many stupid girls in the media. Hermione's not scared to be clever. I think sometimes really smart girls dumb themselves down a bit, and that's bad. When I was nine or ten, I would get really upset when they tried to make me look geeky, but now I absolutely love it. I find it's so much pressure to be beautiful. Hermione doesn't care what she looks like. She's a complete tomboy."

Screenwriter Steve Kloves revealed in a 2003 interview that Hermione was his favourite character. "There's something about her fierce intellect coupled with a complete lack of understanding of how she affects people sometimes that I just find charming and irresistible to write."

Theatre
In Harry Potter and the Cursed Child, Hermione is played by Eswatini-born actress Noma Dumezweni, known for her work in Linda, A Raisin in the Sun and A Human Being Died That Night. Dumezweni described the role as a "privilege and a responsibility" and said that "we all aspire to be Hermione." The choice of a black actress to play her, led to criticism on social media, which J.K. Rowling described as being by "a bunch of racists", adding that the books never explicitly mention her race or skin tone (though she did write in Harry Potter and the Prisoner of Azkaban, "Hermione's white face was sticking out from behind a tree.") and that she has been portrayed as black in fan art. Dumezweni herself called the backlash "so unimaginative", stating that "So many young actors and actresses have told me that they’re so pleased I’m playing Hermione because they can see a version of themselves on the stage."

Dumezweni got praise for her performance; The Independent said that she "did a tremendous job as the stern witch." At the 2017 Laurence Olivier Awards, Dumezweni got the Award for Best Actress in a Supporting Role for her portrayal of Hermione.

In popular culture
Hermione has been parodied in many sketches and animated series. On Saturday Night Live, Lindsay Lohan played Hermione. On his show Big Impression, Alistair McGowan did a sketch, "Louis Potter and the Philosopher's Scone". It featured impressions of Nigella Lawson as Hermione. In 2003, Comic Relief performed a spoof story called Harry Potter and the Secret Chamberpot of Azerbaijan, in which Miranda Richardson, who plays Rita Skeeter in the Harry Potter films, featured as Hermione. Hermione also features in the Harry Bladder sketches in All That, where she appears as Herheiny and is played by Lisa Foiles. The Wedge, an Australian sketch comedy, parodies Hermione and Harry in love on a "Cooking With..." show before being caught by Snape. Hermione also appears as Hermione Ranger in Harry Podder: Dude Where's My Wand?, a play by Desert Star Theater in Utah, written by sisters Laura J., Amy K. and Anna M. Lewis. In the 2008 American comedy film Yes Man, Allison (played by Zooey Deschanel) accompanies Carl (Jim Carrey) to a Harry Potter-themed party dressed as Hermione.

In Harry Cover, a French comic book parody of Harry Potter by Pierre Veys (later translated into Spanish and English), Hermione appears as Harry Cover's friend Hormone. Hermione also appears in Potter Puppet Pals sketches by Neil Cicierega; and in the A Very Potter Musical, A Very Potter Sequel, and A Very Potter Senior Year musicals by StarKid Productions played by Bonnie Gruesen in the first two and Meredith Stepien in the third.

Hermione is the focus of the fan-created web-series, Hermione Granger and the Quarter Life Crisis.

Notes

Bibliography 
Page numbers are shown as (UK/US) where applicable

References

Sources

External links 

 Hermione's entry at Harry Potter Lexicon

Child characters in film
Child characters in literature
Child characters in musical theatre
Female characters in literature
Female characters in film
Female characters in musical theatre
Fictional activists
Literary characters introduced in 1997
Fictional child soldiers
Fictional English people
Fictional members of secret societies
Fictional politicians
Fictional war veterans
Film sidekicks
Harry Potter characters
Sidekicks in literature
Teenage characters in film
Teenage characters in literature
Teenage characters in musical theatre
Time travelers
Emma Watson
Fictional bibliophiles
Fictional witches